NS Wanderers RC, formed in 1984, is a Malaysian rugby union club that plays in the city of Seremban in the state of Negeri Sembilan, Malaysia. It currently competes in the MRU Super League, the top level of the Malaysian rugby union league system.

The club was founded in 1950s.

Club honours

 MRU Super League
 Champions: 
 Runners-up:
 MRU Super Cup
 Champions: 
 Runners-up:
 National Inter Club Championship
 Champions: 2002, 2007, 2008 
 Runners-up:
 Agong Cup
 Champions: 
 Runners-ups:

Current squad

Internationally capped players

Notes and references
Irishman Ken McDonnell enjoyed a brief successful period with Wanderers. Winning two championships. He would leave with the unique record of being the only Irishman to win a club rugby championship anywhere in Asia.

External links
 NS Wanderers RC's website
 NS Wanderers Rugby Club Facebook Page

Malaysian rugby union clubs
Rugby union in Malaysia